Antemasque is the only studio album by American band Antemasque, released in 2014.

Recording
Antemasque was recorded at The Boat in Silverlake, California. The studio, formerly owned by The Dust Brothers, is currently owned and operated by Flea.

Release
On April 9, 2014, Antemasque released the album's first single "4AM". Rolling Stone described the song as "a charging, punkish rocker with the sorts of squiggly noodling that both the Mars Volta guys and Flea have used as calling cards in their respective groups." The next day, the band released a second song, "Hangin in the Lurch," on their bandcamp page, which is described as a mix of progressive rock and punk rock. The song's description mentioned that it would be released on an upcoming self-titled album. Their third single, "People Forget," was released on April 11, 2014. On April 15, the band released their fourth single, "Drown All Your Witches."

Critical reception
NME wrote that "‘I Got No Remorse’ and ‘Momento Mori’ are both urgent, punk-inspired blasts of rock’n’roll, while the jangly romanticism of ‘50,000 Kilowatts’ is surely the most sentimental song [Bixler-Zavala and Rodriguez-Lopez have] ever written – and one of the best."

Track listing

Personnel
Antemasque:
Cedric Bixler Zavala – vocals
Omar Rodríguez-López – guitars, keyboards, production
David Elitch – drums
Flea – bass
Jonathan Debaun - engineering
Matt Bittman – mixing
Chris Common – mastering
Sonny Kay – album art
Jason Farrell –  layout

References

External links
"Antemasque"'s official website

2014 debut albums
Omar Rodríguez-López albums